"Drive Me Crazy" is the debut single released by English singer Peter Andre from his self-titled debut album. The single was released on 20 April 1992 through Melodian Records. The single peaked at #72 on the Australian singles chart in June 1992.

Track listing
 CD1 / Cassette
 "Drive Me Crazy" (R'N'B Mix) - 3:58 
 "Drive Me Crazy" (Crazy Cool Funk Mix) - 6:36

 CD2
 "Drive Me Crazy" (Single Mix) - 4:04
 "Drive Me Crazy" (Crazy Cool Funk Mix) - 6:36
 "Drive Me Crazy" (Instrumental) - 4:03

Charts

References

1992 debut singles
Peter Andre songs
Songs written by Peter Andre
1992 songs
Songs written by Ian Curnow
Songs written by Phil Harding (producer)